Snooker world rankings 2004/2005: The professional world rankings for the top 64 snooker players in the 2004–05 season are listed below. This was Chris Small's only season in top 16, and Paul Hunter's only appearance in the top 4.

References

2004
Rankings 2005
Rankings 2004